Laevityphis tillierae is a species of sea snail, a marine gastropod mollusk in the family Muricidae, the murex snails or rock snails.

Description

Distribution
This marine species occurs off New Caledonia.

References

 Houart, R., 1986. Mollusca Gastropoda: Noteworthy Muricidae from the Pacific Ocean, with description of seven new species. Mémoires du Muséum national d'Histoire naturelle 133(A)("1985"): 427–455

External links
 MNHN, Paris: holotype

Laevityphis
Gastropods described in 1985